Aloeides aranda, the Aranda copper, is a butterfly of the family Lycaenidae. It is found in the whole of South Africa, except in high montane forests and the arid western areas. It is also found in Zimbabwe.

The wingspan is 20–29 mm for males and 27–31 mm females. Adults are on wing from September to April in warm areas (with peaks in October and February) and in October and February in two generations in cooler areas.

The larvae feed on Aspalathus species, a genus of legumes. They are attended to by Pheidole capensis ants.

References

Butterflies described in 1857
Aloeides